It's Me is the debut extended play by South Korean singer Hyolyn and second music release after her album Love & Hate in 2013. The album was released on November 8, 2016 by Starship Entertainment and distributed by LOEN Entertainment.

Background and release
On October 11, 2016, it was announced that Hyolyn would make a comeback after three years since her last album. Starship Entertainment released news of the singer's comeback, with a message including a special image that revealed the upcoming schedule for her comeback. The teaser image included a featuring with Dok2 and Jay Park. It was revealed that Hyolyn will go with more Hip-hop style, unlike her previous releases. Later a concept photos were released.

On October 21, a teaser was released for the first single featuring Dok2, the single was released on October 25. On October 27, another teaser for the second single was released, while the single released on October 31. On November 3, the third photo concept were released, the next day a teaser for third single "Paradise" was released. The music video was released on November 8.

Track listing

Chart performance

Sales

Release history

References

External links
 
 
 

2016 debut EPs
Sistar EPs
Kakao M EPs
Dance-pop EPs
Contemporary R&B EPs
Korean-language EPs
Starship Entertainment EPs